The wing-barred piprites (Piprites chloris) is a species of bird which traditionally has placed in the family Tyrannidae.

It is found in Argentina, Bolivia, Brazil, Colombia, Ecuador, French Guiana, Guyana, Paraguay, Peru, Suriname, and Venezuela. Its natural habitats are subtropical or tropical moist lowland forest and subtropical or tropical moist montane forest.

References

wing-barred piprites
Birds of the Amazon Basin
Birds of Colombia
Birds of Venezuela
Birds of the Guianas
Birds of the Atlantic Forest
wing-barred piprites
Birds of Brazil
Taxonomy articles created by Polbot